Sărățeni is a commune located in Ialomița County, Muntenia, Romania. It is composed of a single village, Sărățeni, and was part of Balaciu Commune prior to being split off in 2005.

References

Communes in Ialomița County
Localities in Muntenia